Hot Saki & Bedtime Stories is the second and final studio album by American alternative rock band Catherine. It was released on September 17, 1996, through TVT Records. D'arcy Wretzky of The Smashing Pumpkins, drummer Kerry Brown's wife at the time, contributed vocals on the record.

The song "Four Leaf Clover" was released as a single, and another song, "Whisper," was contributed to the soundtrack of the film Scream.

Critical reception 

In their retrospective review, AllMusic called it "an even more varied and generally successful package" than their previous studio album, Sorry!

Track listing

Music videos 

 "Four-Leaf Clover" (1996)
 "Whisper" (1996)

Personnel 

 Catherine

 Keith Brown –  bass guitar
 Kerry Brown – drums
 Mark Rew – vocals
 Additional personnel

 Jerome Brown – guitar on track 6
 Chris Connelly – backing vocals on track 11
 Fever – backing vocals and guitar on track 2
 Neil Jendon – backing vocals and trombone on track 6
 Marina Peterson – cello on tracks 9 and 12
 Todd Tatnall – timpani on track 4
 D'arcy Wretzky – vocals on tracks 5 and 7

 Production

 Kerry Brown – mixing on tracks 1, 2, 4, 6, 8, 10, 11, 13, and 14
 Catherine – production, recording
 Chris Hayback – additional engineering
 Neil Jendon – guitar on tracks 1, 4, 6, 8, 11, 13, and 14
 David Kahne – mixing on tracks 3, 5, 7, 9, and 12
 Jeff Lane – mixing on track 2
 Steve Spapperi – mixing on tracks 1, 4, 6, 8, and 13
 Todd Tatnall – additional engineering

References

External links 

 
 

1996 albums
Catherine (alternative rock band) albums
TVT Records albums